A double referendum was held in Liechtenstein on 25 February 1962. The first question was on the subject of the law on civic defence, and was rejected by 74.3% of voters. The second was on the game hunting law, and was approved by 54.6% of voters.

Results

Civic defence law

Game hunting law

References

1962 referendums
1962 in Liechtenstein
Referendums in Liechtenstein
February 1962 events in Europe
Hunting referendums